Elodes is a genus of marsh beetles in the family Scirtidae. There are more than 60 described species in Elodes.

Species
These 69 species belong to the genus Elodes:

 Elodes abeillei Klausnitzer, 1990
 Elodes amamiensis Satô, 1966
 Elodes amicula Klausnitzer, 1980
 Elodes angelini Klausnitzer, 1987
 Elodes angusta Hatch, 1962
 Elodes apicalis (LeConte, 1866)
 Elodes aquatica (Blaisdell, 1940)
 Elodes arcana Klausnitzer, 1972
 Elodes australis Klausnitzer, 1990
 Elodes bertiae Klausnitzer, 1988
 Elodes brasiliensis Guérin-Méneville, 1843
 Elodes bulgharensis Klausnitzer, 1980
 Elodes calabriae Klausnitzer, 1987
 Elodes chrysocomes (Abeille de Perrin, 1872)
 Elodes chrysosomes Abeille, 1872
 Elodes clemenceaui Pic, 1918
 Elodes combusta Guérin-Méneville, 1843
 Elodes corsica Pic, 1898
 Elodes cretica Klausnitzer, 1973
 Elodes denticulata Klausnitzer, 1973
 Elodes elegans Yoshitomi, 1997
 Elodes elongata Tournier, 1869
 Elodes emarginata Hatch, 1962
 Elodes estiennei Pic, 1918
 Elodes fayollei Pic, 1918
 Elodes genei Guérin-Méneville, 1843
 Elodes globulus Klausnitzer, 1990
 Elodes impressa Hatch, 1962
 Elodes johni Klausnitzer, 1975
 Elodes kojimai Nakane, 1963
 Elodes lloydi Pic, 1918
 Elodes longulus Klausnitzer, 1990
 Elodes maculicollis Horn, 1880
 Elodes malickyi Klausnitzer, 1976
 Elodes marginata (Fabricius, 1798)
 Elodes marginicollis Guérin-Méneville, 1843
 Elodes marnei Pic, 1918
 Elodes minuta (Linnaeus, 1767)
 Elodes nebrodensis Ragusa, 1885
 Elodes nimbata (Panzer, 1794)
 Elodes nocturna Klausnitzer, 1979
 Elodes novacretica Klausnitzer, 1990
 Elodes nunenmacheri Wolcott, 1922
 Elodes oblonga Guérin-Méneville, 1843
 Elodes pendens Klausnitzer, 1990
 Elodes peninsularis Pic, 1898
 Elodes petaini Pic, 1918
 Elodes pichoni Pic, 1918
 Elodes pollux Klausnitzer, 2008
 Elodes pseudominuta Klausnitzer, 1971
 Elodes raynali Pic, 1918
 Elodes scutellaris Tournier, 1868
 Elodes secundocretica Klausnitzer, 1976
 Elodes sericea Kiesenwetter, 1859
 Elodes sieberi Klausnitzer, 1973
 Elodes sororum Pic, 1918
 Elodes takahashii Yoshitomi, 2005
 Elodes tournieri Kiesenwetter, 1871
 Elodes tricuspis Nyholm, 1985
 Elodes venetae Klausnitzer, 1987
 Elodes wiisoni Pic, 1918
 Elodes wilsoni
 † Elodes beigeli Klausnitzer, 2012
 † Elodes mysticopalpalis Klausnitzer, 2012
 † Helodes egregia (Klausnitzer, 1976)
 † Helodes minax (Klausnitzer, 1976)
 † Helodes modesta (Klausnitzer, 1976)
 † Helodes setosa (Klausnitzer, 1976)
 † Helodes transversa (Klausnitzer, 1976)

References

Further reading

External links

 

Scirtoidea
Articles created by Qbugbot